Project Kuwait is a $7 billion, 25-year plan, first formulated in 1997 by the SPC, to increase the country's oil production (and to help compensate for declines at the mature Burgan field), with the help of international oil companies. In particular, Kuwait aims to increase output at five northern oil fields—Abdali, Bahra, Ratqa, Raudhatain, and Sabriya (Kuwait's third largest field)—from their current rate of around 650,000 bbl/d to 900,000 bbl/d within three years.

The project was criticized by Ahmed Al-Sadoun and Musallam Al-Barrak of the parliamentary opposition group Popular Action Bloc for allowing international companies a role in developing the fields. Al-Barrak stated that they should be developed by Kuwaiti companies.

References 

Petroleum in Kuwait